Raúl Alejandro Cáceres Bogado (born 18 September 1991) is a Paraguayan footballer who plays for Brazilian club América Mineiro.

Career

Club career
Raúl is the son of legendary Olimpia defender Virginio Cáceres.
Raúl made his professional debut with Olimpia then play with Carapeguá, Sol de América and since 2016 in Cerro Porteño.

International career
Raúl was named in Paraguay's provisional squad for Copa América Centenario but was cut from the final squad.

References

External links
 
 
 Clubcerro.com

1991 births
Living people
Paraguayan footballers
Paraguayan expatriate footballers
Paraguay international footballers
Club Olimpia footballers
Sportivo Carapeguá footballers
Club Sol de América footballers
Cerro Porteño players
CR Vasco da Gama players
Cruzeiro Esporte Clube players
América Futebol Clube (MG) players
Paraguayan Primera División players
Campeonato Brasileiro Série A players
Campeonato Brasileiro Série B players
Sportspeople from Asunción
Association football defenders
Paraguayan expatriate sportspeople in Brazil
Expatriate footballers in Brazil
20th-century Paraguayan people
21st-century Paraguayan people